Credulity, Superstition and Fanaticism is a satirical print by the English artist William Hogarth. It ridicules secular and religious credulity, and lampoons the exaggerated religious "enthusiasm" (excessive emotion, not keenness) of the Methodist movement. The print was originally engraved in 1761, with the title Enthusiasm Delineated, but never published. The original print may have been a response to three essays published by Joshua Reynolds in The Idler in 1759, praising the sublime work of Italian Counter-Reformation artists. It certainly satirized both the English connoisseurs' enthusiasm for old masters and Roger de Piles's Balance de peintres, which was much discussed among art critics in the eighteenth century. However, Hogarth reworked the engraving before publishing it on 15 March 1762 as Credulity, Superstition and Fanaticism: A Medley, now laying more stress on Methodist fanaticism and echoing his earlier print, The Sleeping Congregation of 1736, in which an Anglican clergyman's boring sermon puts his congregation to sleep.

Interpretation

The preacher
The print depicts a preacher – possibly an allusion to George Whitefield – speaking to a church congregation from the top of a high pulpit. His text is opened at a page which reads "I speak as a fool", and he is wearing a Harlequin jacket under his clerical gown. He is holding a puppet of a devil with a gridiron in his left hand and a puppet of a witch suckling an incubus in his right hand. His wig is falling off to reveal a Jesuit's tonsure underneath. To the right, the "scale of vociferation" measures his oratory, rising from "natural tone" to "bull roar". (In  Enthusiasm Delineated, the puppet of the witch was a figure representing God (after a painting by Raphael), and the sides of the pulpit are adorned with additional pairs of religious puppets which are omitted in its final version.)

Superstition
The print includes visual references to more than a dozen reputed instances of witchcraft or possession in England. The three figures decorating the pulpit each hold a candle, and allude to the ghost seen by Sir George Villiers (whose name appears in a book held by the figure on the right), the ghost of the stabbed Julius Caesar appearing before Brutus, and the ghost of Mrs Veale (immortalised by Daniel Defoe in A True Relation of the Apparition of One Mrs. Veal the Next Day after her Death to One Mrs. Bargrave at Canterbury 8 September 1705).

In a box pew at the foot of the pulpit, another clergyman pushes an icon of the Cock Lane ghost down the shirt of a young lady in the throes of religious ecstasy. (In Enthusiasm Delineated, this was an aristocratic rake fondling the breast of a woman.) The "Poors Box" has grown cobwebs, showing Hogarth's view that the Methodists were disregarding good works by emphasising faith so strongly. To the right, standing on copies of Wesley's Sermons, and Glanvill's Book of Witches, a religious thermometer measures the emotional states of a brain (borrowed from one of Christopher Wren's anatomical illustrations) from a central reading of lukewarm, either upwards through love heat, to lust, ecstasy, madness and raving, or downwards through low spirits to sorrow, agony, settled grief to despair, then madness and suicide. On top of the thermometer is an image of the Cock Lane ghost, and the Drummer of Tedworth.

The congregation are in various states of ecstasy, grief and horror. Another minister (most likely a representation of the squint-eyed George Whitefield) sings, accompanied by weeping cherubs. A shoe-black vomits nails and pins – possible a reference to the boy of Bilson, who ate metal items. Next to him a woman lies on the floor with rabbits running from under her skirt - this must be Mary Toft, a woman from Godalming, who in 1726 was supposed to have given birth to a litter of rabbits. A Jew with a knife sacrifices an insect on the altar. A turbaned Turk looks in at the window, quietly smoking a pipe, and thanks the prophet that he is a Muslim. He represents the "rational, enlightened part of mankind looking down on Christian fanatics with surprise and disgust."

Above the congregation is suspended a "A New and Correct Globe of Hell by Romaine" (possibly referring to William Romaine), with parts labelled "Molten Lead Lake", "Pitch & Tar Rivers", "Horrid Zone", "The Brimstone Ocean", and "Eternal Damnation Gulf". One man below the globe is terrified when a preacher next to him, possibly John Wesley, points it out to him.

Beneath the engraving Hogarth quotes , "Believe not every Spirit, but try the Spirits whether they are of God: because many false Prophets are gone out into the World."

Reception
Art historian Horace Walpole praised Hogarth, stating that this print "surpassed all his other performances" and "would alone immortalize his unequalled talents."

References

External links
Bernd Krysmanski, "We see a Ghost: Hogarth's Satire on Methodists and Connoisseurs", Art Bulletin, 80, No. 2 (1998), pp. 292-310.   
Antony Clayton, "Credulity, Superstition and Fanaticism: who believed in ghosts in Hogarth’s England?" 
Satires of William Hogarth: EGL 310
"William Hogarth - The Medley", La Clé des Langues (en ligne), Lyon, June 2013

Prints by William Hogarth
1762 works